The Nonpartisan League (NPL) was a left-wing political party founded in 1915 in North Dakota by Arthur C. Townley, a former organizer for the Socialist Party of America. On behalf of small farmers and merchants, the Nonpartisan League advocated state control of mills, grain elevators, banks and other farm-related industries in order to reduce the power of corporate and political interests from Minneapolis and Chicago.

The goat served as the League's mascot. It was known as "The Goat that Can't be Got".

History 

By the 1910s, the growth of left-wing sympathies was on the rise in North Dakota. The Socialist Party of North Dakota had considerable success. They brought in many outside speakers, including Eugene V. Debs spoke at a large antiwar rally at Garrison in 1915. By 1912, there were 175 Socialist politicians in the state. Rugby and Hillsboro elected Socialist mayors.  The party had also established a weekly newspaper, the Iconoclast, in Minot.

In 1914, Arthur C. Townley, a flax farmer from Beach, North Dakota, and organizer for the Socialist Party of America, had attended a meeting of the American Society of Equity. Afterwards, Townley and a friend, Frank B. Wood, drew up a radical political platform that addressed many of the farmers' concerns, and created the Farmers Non-Party League Organization, which later evolved into the Nonpartisan League. Soon, Townley was traveling the state in a borrowed Ford Model T signing up members for a payment of $6 in dues. Farmers were receptive to Townley's ideas and joined in droves. However, Townley was soon expelled from the Socialist Party due to this method of rogue operating.

The League grew larger beginning in 1915, at a time when small farmers in North Dakota felt exploited by out-of-state companies. One author later described the wheat-growing state as "a tributary province of Minneapolis-St. Paul." Minnesota banks made its loans, Minnesota millers handled its grain, and Alexander McKenzie, North Dakota's political boss, lived in Saint Paul, Minnesota. Rumors spread at a Society of Equity meeting in Bismarck that a state representative named Treadwell Twichell had told a group of farmers to "go home and slop the hogs." Twichell later said that his statement was misinterpreted. He had been instrumental in previous legislative reforms to rescue the state from boss rule by MacKenzie and the Northern Pacific Railroad around the start of the 20th century.

Rise to power in North Dakota 
Proposing that the state of North Dakota create its own bank, warehouses, and factories, the League, supported by a populist groundswell, ran its slate as Republican Party candidates in the 1916 elections. In the gubernatorial election, farmer Lynn Frazier, won with 79% of the vote. In 1917, John Miller Baer won a special election for the United States House of Representatives. After the 1918 elections, in which the NPL won full control of both houses of the state legislature, the League enacted a significant portion of its platform. It established state-run agricultural enterprises such as the North Dakota Mill and Elevator, the Bank of North Dakota, and a state-owned railroad. The legislature also passed a statewide graduated income tax, which distinguished between earned and unearned income, authorized a state hail insurance fund, and established a workmen's compensation fund that assessed employers. The NPL also set up a Home Building Association, to aid people in financing and building houses.

During World War I, Townley demanded the "conscription of wealth", blaming "big-bellied, red-necked plutocrats" for the war. He and fellow party leader William Lemke received support for the League from isolationist German-Americans. However, the NPL's initial success was short-lived, as a drop in commodity prices at the close of the war, together with a drought, caused an agricultural depression.

Decline 
As a result of the depression, the new state-owned industries ran into financial trouble, and the private banking industry, smarting from the loss of its influence in Bismarck, rebuffed the NPL when it tried to raise money through state-issued bonds. The industry said that the state bank and elevator were "theoretical experiments" that might easily fail. Moreover, the NPL's lack of governing experience led to perceived infighting and corruption. Newspapers and business groups portrayed the NPL as inept and disastrous for the state's future.

In 1918, opponents of the NPL formed the Independent Voters Association. In 1921, the IVA organized a recall election which successfully recalled Frazier as governor. Frazier lost the recall election by a margin of 1.8%, becoming the first U.S. state governor to be recalled. However, a year later he was elected in the 1922 United States Senate election in North Dakota, serving until 1940.

The 1920s were economically difficult for farmers, and the NPL's popularity receded. However, the populist undercurrent that fueled its meteoric growth revived with the coming of the Great Depression and Dust Bowl conditions of the 1930s. The NPL's William "Wild Bill" Langer was elected to the governorship in 1932 and 1936. Langer was later elected to the U.S. Senate, serving from 1940 until his death in 1959.

By 1950, two factions divided the traditionally left-wing NPL; on one side were the Insurgents, and on the other were the Old Guard.  The Insurgents aligned liberally with pro-farmers' union, organized labor, and Democratic Party groups. The Insurgents wanted to merge the NPL with the North Dakota Democratic Party. In 1952, the Insurgents formed the Volunteers for Stevenson Committee, to help elect Adlai Stevenson II, the governor of Illinois and Democratic nominee for president. The Old Guard, also known as the Capitol Crowd, were more conservative, anti-farmers' union, anti-labor, and pro-Republican segment of the league, these members wanted to keep the Nonpartisan League aligned with the Republican Party; they supported General Dwight D. Eisenhower in the 1952 presidential race. Over the following four years, legislative polarization grew and the Nonpartisan League eventually split in two. In 1956, the Nonpartisan League formally merged with the state Democratic Party, creating the North Dakota Democratic-Nonpartisan League Party, while much of the League's base joined the North Dakota Republican Party. The Democratic-Nonpartisan League Party introduced a unified slate of candidates for statewide offices and adopted a liberal platform that included the repeal of the Taft–Hartley Act, creation of a minimum wage of $1.25 an hour, and a graduated land tax on property worth $20,000 or more. In May 1956, the Democratic Convention accepted the Nonpartisan League's candidates and adopted its platform, fully unifying the two parties into one.

Although the Democrats were still in the minority in the state government, the number of Democrats in the state legislature increased greatly. Before the league moved into the Democratic Party, there were only 5 Democrats among the 162 members of both houses of the legislature in 1955. By 1957, the number grew to 28, and in 1959 the numbers continued to grow, reaching 67.

Representation in other media
Northern Lights (1978), a feature film starring Joe Spano, portrayed early 20th century conditions in North Dakota and the rise of the NPL among immigrant farmers. The film won the 1980 Camera d'Or award for best first film at the Cannes Film Festival.
The didactic historical novel Harangue (The Trees Said to the Bramble Come Reign Over Us) (1926) by Garet Garrett tells the story of the Non-Partisan League and its various supporters after the league took control of the North Dakota government in 1919.

Legacy

The NPL arose as a faction within the Republican Party in 1915. By the 1950s, its members felt more affiliation with the Democratic Party and merged with that party of North Dakota. The North Dakota branch of the Democratic Party is therefore known as the North Dakota Democratic-Nonpartisan League Party to this day. The Executive Committee of the NPL still formally exists within the party structure of the North Dakota Democratic-NPL. It was at one point headed by former State Senator Buckshot Hoffner (D-NPL, Esmond), chairman, and former Lt. Governor Lloyd B. Omdahl, Secretary.
The Nonpartisan League laid a foundation of enriched public ownership and responsibility in such institutions as a state bank. One study has drawn conclusions that publicly operated institutions such as the state bank have helped North Dakota weather these economic storms.
The Bank of North Dakota was created to address market failures associated with monopoly power among large financial and business institutions in the early twentieth century. This market power meant that small farming operations had inadequate access to credit. One of the goals of the Nonpartisan League was to remedy limited access to credit by establishing this institution. A measure of the public good brought about by the Bank's establishment that still stands today is what some have identified as the Bank's role in reducing the impact of economic recession. The public-private relationship establishes roles assigned according to what each sector does best, allowing the mutual benefit of public and private banks balancing out inequality and building equality, thus creating an economic safety net for North Dakota citizens. These early roots of the Democratic-Nonpartisan League party have been celebrated for establishing a foundation that rights the state in times of national crisis and provides economic security to generations of the state's farmers.
As of May 2021, both the North Dakota Mill and Elevator and the Bank of North Dakota continue to operate. The legislature in 1932 prohibited corporate farming and corporate ownership of farmland.
The Fred and Gladys Grady House and the Oliver and Gertrude Lundquist House, both in Bismarck, North Dakota, are listed on the U.S. National Register of Historic Places as examples of the work of the Nonpartisan League's Home Building Association.

See also

 Agricultural Workers Organization
 Granger movement
 Boll weevil (politics)
 Minnesota Farmer–Labor Party
 Minnesota Democratic–Farmer–Labor Party
 Socialist Party of North Dakota
 North Dakota Democratic–Nonpartisan League Party
 Alice Lorraine Daly

Footnotes

Further reading
 Ellsworth, Scott. Origins of the Nonpartisan League. PhD dissertation. Duke University, 1982.
 Gaston, Herbert E. The Nonpartisan League. New York: Harcourt, Brace and Howe, 1920.
 Huntington, Samuel P. "The Election Tactics of the Nonpartisan League, Mississippi Valley Historical Review, vol. 36, no. 4 (March 1950), pp. 613–632. in JSTOR
 Lansing, Michael. Insurgent democracy: the Nonpartisan League in North American politics (University of Chicago Press, 2015)
 Lipset, Seymour M. (1971) Agrarian Socialism, (University of California Press, Berkeley)
 Morlan, Robert L. Political Prairie Fire: The Nonpartisan League 1915–1922. St. Paul: Minnesota Historical Society Press, 1955.
 Morlan, Robert L. "The Nonpartisan League and the Minnesota Campaign of 1918," Minnesota History, vol. 34, no. 6 (Summer 1955), pp. 221–232. In JSTOR
 Moum, Kathleen. "The Social Origins of the Nonpartisan League." North Dakota History 53 (Spring 1986): 18–22.
 Moum, Kathleen Diane. Harvest of Discontent: The Social Origins of the Nonpartisan League, 1880–1922. PhD Dissertation. University of California, Irvine, 1986.
 Nielsen, Kim E. "'We All Leaguers by Our House': Women, Suffrage, and Red-Baiting in the National Nonpartisan League." Journal of Women's History, vol. 6, no. 1 (1994), pp. 31–50.
 Reid, Bill G. "John Miller Baer: Nonpartisan League Cartoonist and Congressman," North Dakota History, vol. 44, no. 1 (1977), pp. 4–13.
 Remele, Larry. "Power to the People: The Nonpartisan League," in Thomas W. Howard, ed. The North Dakota Political Tradition. Ames, IA: Iowa State University Press, 1981.
 Remele, Larry R. "The Lost Years of A.C. Townley (after the Nonpartisan League)." ND Humanities Council Occasional Paper, (1988) no. 1, pages 1–27 
 Rude, Leslie G. "The Rhetoric of Farmer‐Labor Agitators." Communication Studies 20.4 (1969): 280–285.
 Saloutos, Theodore. "The Expansion and Decline of the Nonpartisan League in the Western Middle West, 1917–1921," Agricultural History, vol. 20, no. 4 (Oct. 1946), pp. 235–252. In JSTOR
 Saloutos, Theodore. "The Rise of the Nonpartisan League in North Dakota, 1915–1917," Agricultural History, vol. 20, no. 1 (Jan. 1946), pp. 43–61. In JSTOR
 Schoeder, Lavern.Women in the Nonpartisan League in Adams and Hettinger Counties. (In "Women on the Move", edited by Pearl Andre, 47–50: Book produced for the International Women's Year for North Dakota Democratic-NPL Women, 1975).
 Starr, Karen. "Fighting for a Future: Farm Women of the Nonpartisan League," Minnesota History, (Summer 1983), pp. 255–262.
 Vivian, James F. "The Last Round-Up: Theodore Roosevelt Confronts the Nonpartisan League, October 1918," Montana: The Magazine of Western History, vol. 36, no. 1 (Winter 1986), pp. 36–49.  in JSTOR
 Wasson, Stanley Philip. The Nonpartisan League in Minnesota: 1916–1924. (PhD Dissertation, University of Pennsylvania, 1955).
 Wilkins, Robert P. "The Nonpartisan League and Upper Midwest Isolationism, Agricultural History, vol. 39, no. 2 (April 1965), pp. 102–109. In JSTOR

External links 
 Nonpartisan League in MNopedia, the Minnesota Encyclopedia 
 North Dakota Democratic-NPL Party Website
 North Dakota State University Institute for Regional Studies Nonpartisan League Collection
 Article on the NPL from the Progressive Populist
 Northern Lights – docudrama of the forming of the Nonpartisan League in North Dakota*
 Socialist Herald / The Herald (1915–1916) Seattle newspaper associated with the NPL.
 The Rise and Fall of the Non-Partisan League- PBS Documentary

 
Political parties established in 1915
History of North Dakota
Defunct political parties in the United States
Regional and state political parties in the United States
Political parties in North Dakota
1915 establishments in North Dakota
Localism (politics)
State and local socialist parties in the United States